Washington Township is a township in Johnson County, Iowa, USA. In 2021, its population was 1,108.

History
Washington Township was organized in 1846.

References

Townships in Johnson County, Iowa
Townships in Iowa
1846 establishments in Iowa Territory